Frank Reilly may refer to:

 Frank J. Reilly (1906–1967), American painter, illustrator, muralist, and teacher
 Frank Reilly (footballer) (1894–1956), Scottish football centre half

See also
Frank Riley (disambiguation)